Adolphe Yvon (1817–1893) was a French painter known for his paintings of the Napoleonic Wars. Yvon studied under Paul Delaroche, rose to fame during the Second Empire, then finished his career as a teacher.

Career
Shortly after the end of the Crimean War in September 1855, Yvon was commissioned by the French government to paint a large picture of the capture of the Malakoff at Sevastopol. He sailed for the Crimea on February 19, 1856, where he spent six weeks compiling a portfolio of sketches, as well as visiting the battlefield of Inkerman. In 1857, the finished painting La Prise de la tour de Malakoff 8 septembre 1855 was shown at the Paris Salon, and two years later came La Gorge de Malakoff, and La courtine de Malakoff. La Prise was a massive piece measuring 6 metres by 9 metres and represented the moment when the fortification was captured around midday.

In the succeeding years, Emperor Napoleon III  began to admire his battle scenes; naturally he glorified the carnage of Napoleon I's campaigns.  Yvon became an officer of the Légion d'honneur in 1867, and painted Napoleon III's portrait the following year (unlocated).  Yvon was  known as the leading teacher of drawing at the École des Beaux-Arts (1863–83). Some of his most notable students include António Soares dos Reis and Henrique Pousão.  A few Americans received instruction from him, including Christian Schussele, Alfred Wordsworth Thompson, William Sartain, and J. Alden Weir.  The latter took Yvon's afternoon life-drawing class starting in the fall of 1874.  Yvon provided the subject for compositional sketches for his students, for example, "The Assassination of Julius Caesar", for which he specified how it should be done: "Caesar covers his head with his toga . . . he was shoved to the base of Pompey's statue, which became bathed in his blood." (Archives of the École des Beaux-Arts, Archives Nationales, AJ52 63).  Alexander Stewart, the American collector, commissioned Yvon to paint The Reconciliation of the North and the South (lost) in 1870, as well as The Genius of America (1858, 1870).  His Portrait of President Carnot (1888) appeared at the World's Columbian Exposition.

Gallery

References

Further reading
 Eaton, D. Cady (1909). A Handbook of Modern French Painting. New York: Dodd, Mead and Co., p. 284.
 Thierry, A., "Adolphe Yvon: Souvenirs d'un peintre militaire", Revue des Deux Mondes 71 (1933): 844-873.
 Heiser, E. (1974). Adolphe Yvon, 1817–1893, et les siens: Notices biographiques. Sarreguemines.
 Trapp, Frank (2000). "Adolphe Yvon", in From Monet to Cézanne: Late 19th Century French Artists. The Grove Dictionary of Art. London: Macmillan, 2000, pp. 421–422.

Paintings
 The Assassination of Julius Caesar
 The Charge of the French Cuirassiers at Reichshof
 Marshall Ney at Retreat in Russia
 La Prise de la tour de Malakoff 8 septembre 1855 (Palace of Versailles)
 La Gorge de Malakoff (Palace of Versailles)
 La courtine de Malakoff
 Genius of America (New York State Education Department)
   From Solferino  1863

1817 births
1893 deaths
19th-century French painters
French male painters
French war artists
19th-century war artists
19th-century French male artists